Askhat Rakhatuly Dilmukhamedov (Asqat Rahatūly Dılmūhamedov; born July 26, 1986) is an amateur Kazakh Greco-Roman wrestler, who competes in the men's middleweight category. He won a bronze medal in his division at the 2011 Asian Wrestling Championships in Tashkent, Uzbekistan.

Dilmukhametov represented Kazakhstan at the 2012 Summer Olympics, where he competed for the men's 74 kg Greco-Roman. He received a bye into the second preliminary round, before losing out to Belarusian wrestler Aliaksandr Kikiniou, who was able to score three points in two straight periods, leaving Dilmukhametov without a single point.

In 2021, he won one of the bronze medals in the 77 kg event at the Matteo Pellicone Ranking Series 2021 held in Rome, Italy.

References

External links
Profile – International Wrestling Database
NBC Olympics Profile

1986 births
Living people
Olympic wrestlers of Kazakhstan
Wrestlers at the 2012 Summer Olympics
Sportspeople from Almaty
Kazakhstani male sport wrestlers
Wrestlers at the 2018 Asian Games
Asian Games competitors for Kazakhstan
21st-century Kazakhstani people